The New Year's Cup is an annual international figure skating competition. It is held in January in Bratislava, Slovakia. Medals are awarded in the disciplines of men's and ladies' singles. An ice dancing event was also included in 2013.

Senior medalists

Men

Ladies

Ice dancing

Junior medalists

Men

Ladies

Advanced novice medalists

Men

Ladies

References

External links 
 Official website: New Year's Cup
 Slovak Figure Skating Association
 International Skating Union

Figure skating competitions
Figure skating in Slovakia